Chen Kuan-yu, born October 29, 1990 in New Taipei City, Taiwan, is a Taiwanese professional baseball pitcher for the Rakuten Monkeys of the Chinese Professional Baseball League (CPBL). He has previously played in Nippon Professional Baseball (NPB) for the Yokohama BayStars/Yokohama DeNA BayStars and Chiba Lotte Marines.

Career

Yokohama BayStars 
While a student at National Taiwan Sport University, Chen signed a 3-year ikusei (development) contract with the Yokohama BayStars of Nippon Professional Baseball (NPB) in February, 2011.  Chen underwent Tommy John surgery in 2012 and did not appear in a game that season, returning late in the 2013 season. On July 11, 2014 Chen was promoted from development player to a regular team contract (with his uniform number changing from 118 to 59) and made his official professional debut three days later at Mazda Zoom-Zoom Stadium versus the Hiroshima Carp.  However, his debut game did not go well, and soon after Chen was demoted to the ni-gun squad and subsequently was released from the team in October of that same year.

Chiba Lotte Marines 
Chen joined the free agent player tryouts for the Chiba Lotte Marines of NPB in November, 2014, and after a successful tryout was signed to a one-year, 6 million Japanese Yen contract in December.

In the 2015 preseason, Chen earned a spot in the Lotte starting rotation and made his debut with the team in the opening series in Fukuoka versus the defending champion SoftBank Hawks.  That start ended in a loss, and for the first few months of the season Chen split time between the ichi-gun team and the ni-gun team in Urawa.  However, by the summer Chen was back with the ichi-gun team on a permanent basis, and in the push for a Climax Series spot he proved invaluable, finishing the regular season with 14 2/3 consecutive innings pitched without an earned run.

Chiba Lotte resigned Chen for the 2016 season on January 6, 2016 with a 183% salary increase (to 17 million yen).

On December 11, 2020, he become a free agent.

Rakuten Monkeys
Chen subsequently returned to Taiwan, and was selected second overall in the 2021 Chinese Professional Baseball League draft, by the Rakuten Monkeys. Chen made his CPBL debut on August 24, 2021.

References

External links

1990 births
Living people
Asian Games medalists in baseball
Asian Games silver medalists for Chinese Taipei
Baseball players at the 2010 Asian Games
Baseball players at the 2014 Asian Games
Baseball players from New Taipei
Chiba Lotte Marines players
Medalists at the 2010 Asian Games
Medalists at the 2014 Asian Games
National baseball team players
Nippon Professional Baseball pitchers
Taiwanese expatriate baseball players in Japan
Yokohama BayStars players
Yokohama DeNA BayStars players
2017 World Baseball Classic players
2023 World Baseball Classic players